Go Gwang-gu (born 29 September 1972) is a South Korean weightlifter. He competed at the 1992 Summer Olympics and the 1996 Summer Olympics.

References

External links
 

1972 births
Living people
South Korean male weightlifters
Olympic weightlifters of South Korea
Weightlifters at the 1992 Summer Olympics
Weightlifters at the 1996 Summer Olympics
Place of birth missing (living people)
World Weightlifting Championships medalists
20th-century South Korean people
21st-century South Korean people